The Southern and Eastern Serbia is one of five statistical regions of Serbia. It is also a level-2 statistical region according to the European NUTS. It was formed in 2010. As of 2021 census, the region has a total of 1,421,177 inhabitants.

Formation
In July 2009, the Serbian parliament adopted a law which divided Serbia into seven statistical regions. At first, it was decided that in the territory of current statistical region of Southern and Eastern Serbia there would be two statistical regions – Eastern Region and Southern Region. However, in May 2010, the law was changed, thus the Eastern and Southern region were merged into a single statistical region named Southern and Eastern Serbia.

Districts

The statistical region of Southern and Eastern Serbia is composed of 9 administrative districts:

Economy 
Southern and Eastern Serbia region is the poorest in the country. Only Bor and Zaječar have GDP above the national average. The devastated areas include  Babušnica, Bela Palanka, Bojnik, Bosilegrad, Vladičin Han, Golubac, Žagubica, Kuršumlija, Kučevo, Lebane, Medveđa, Svrljig, Surdulica, Trgovište and Crna Trava.

The GDP of the region in 2017 was €6,640,000,000, or 13.8% of Serbia's GDP. The GDP per capita is €4,249.

Cities and towns
The largest cities and towns of the region are:

Demographics 
According to the 2011 census, the population of Southern and Eastern Serbia is 1,563,916. The most populated city is Niš with around 260,000 people in metro area. Other urban centers are Smederevo, Leskovac, Zajecar and Vranje with more than 50,000 people living in city proper area. The region is heavily affected by depopulation. Most critical situation is in municipalities of Gadžin Han, Crna Trava, Ražanj, Trgovište, as well as Bulgarian populated places Dimitrovgrad and Bosilegrad. A good example of depopulation is Crna Trava that had 13,614 people in 1948, while in 2011 only 1,663 people were recorded.

Albanians boycotted the 2011 census. It's estimated that 50,000 Albanians live in the municipalities of Preševo, Bujanovac and Medveđa. They are making up to 90% of population in Preševo, 50% in Bujanovac and 15% in Medveđa. These municipalities have a positive natural growth rate.

According to the census, only Niš had more people than in 2002.

Transport 
Pan-European Corridor X is passing through Podunavlje, Nišava, Jablanica, Pčinja and Pirot District.

The construction of Niš-Merdare highway should start in the spring of 2020.

Constantine the Great Airport is an international airport located in Niš. It connects the region with important European cities such as Berlin, Vienna, Ljubljana, Rome, Salzburg and others. Niš is also the location of Corridor X branching with one branch going to Sofia and another towards Skopje.

References

External links

 Usvojene izmene i dopune Zakona o regionalnom-razvoju (in Serbian)

 
Statistical regions of Serbia